This is a list of the extreme points of Hungary: the points that are farther north, south, east or west than any other location, as well as the highest and lowest points.

Latitude and longitude 

 North : Hidvégardó in Borsod-Abaúj-Zemplén county 
 South : Kásád in Baranya county
 West : Felsőszölnök in Vas county 
 East : Garbolc in Szabolcs-Szatmár-Bereg county
 Centre: Pusztavacs in Pest county

Altitude 
 Highest : Kékes mountain 1 014 m/3 330 ft, Lowest :Tisza river near Szeged 78 m /259 ft

Other features 
 According to geographic research, the geographical centre of Europe can be found in Tállya, Borsod-Abaúj-Zemplén county.

See also 
 Extreme points of Europe
 Extreme points of Earth

References

Lists of coordinates
Hungary
Extreme